William, Wil, Bill, or Billy Myers may refer to:

Sports
Bill Myers (baseball) (1886–?), American baseball player
Billy Myers (1910–1995), shortstop in Major League Baseball
 William James Myers (1937–2017), American wrestler better known as George Steele
Wil Myers (born 1990), baseball player

Others
 Sir William Myers, 1st Baronet (1750–1805), British soldier
 Sir William James Myers, 2nd Baronet (1783–1811), British soldier
William R. Myers (1836–1907), U.S. Representative from Indiana
William Myers (British politician) (1854–1933), English politician
William Starr Myers (1877–1956), Princeton University professor and historian
Bill Myers (musician), American musician
Bill Myers (born 1953), American author
William Myers (lawyer) (born 1955), American lawyer
Bill H. Myers (born 1956), American actor
William Myers (design writer), American design historian and curator
William Myers, character in The $5,000,000 Counterfeiting Plot

See also
William Meyers (1943–2014), South African boxer
William Frederick Meyers, member of the Legislative Assembly of the Northwest Territories
William Meyer (disambiguation)